Kalabaka (Kalabáka, alternative transliterations are Kalambaka and Kalampaka) is a town and seat of the municipality of Meteora in the Trikala regional unit, part of Thessaly in Greece. The population was 12,000 at the 2011 census, of which 8,330 in the town proper. The Meteora monasteries are located near the town. Kalabaka is the northwestern terminal of the old Thessaly Railways, now part of OSE.

History 
A Greek inscription on the wall of one of the town's oldest churches (Saint John the Baptist) testifies to the existence of an ancient Greek settlement under the name Aiginion.

In the 10th century AD, it was known as Stagoi (Σταγοί), a Byzantine fortress and bishopric (the name is still in use for the town by the Greek Orthodox Church). Of its medieval monuments, only the cathedral, the Church of the Dormition, survives. It was a late 11th- or early 12th-century building, built on the remains of an earlier, late antique church. Relics of an ancient Greek temple – probably of god Apollo – have been incorporated in the wall of the town's oldest and most renowned church, dedicated to the Virgin Mary.

Stagoi is first mentioned in Diatyposis written by the Byzantine Emperor Leo VI the Wise (886-912). In 1163 there was a reference to the castle of Stagoi. In 1204 Stagoi fell under the Despotate of Epirus. At the end of the 13th century they fell under the Duchy of Neopatria. In 1334, they were taken over once more by the Despot of Epirus, John II Orsini, and shortly thereafter they came once more under the control of the Byzantine Empire. In 1348, they were conquered by the Serbs of Stephen Dushan. They reached their peak under the rule of his brother, King Simeon Uroš. When the Ottomans conquered Thessaly, Kalabaka was placed under the administrative rule of the Pasha of Larisa and later on of the Sanjak of Trikala.

It was named "Kalabaka" six or seven centuries ago. It is of Turkish origin and means "powerful fortress". It has been Anglicized variously as Kalampaka, Kalambaka or Kalabaki.

Bishopric history
From the beginning of the 10th century, Stagoi was referred to as an episcopal see, thereby enjoying privileges and donations from the Byzantine emperors throughout the Middle Ages. It owned significant stretches of land and had dependent farmers in neighboring settlements. Besides the fields of northwest Thessaly, its territory included an extensive mountainous zone in Asia and central Pindos. The bishopric of Stagoi, a suffragan of the Metropolis of Larissa, was maintained, with some small intermissions, up to 1900 when it was merged with the bishopric of Tricca to form the Metropolis of Tricca and Stagoi with the town of Trikala as its seat. It was reestablished in 1991, and has been operating ever since as the Metropolis of "Stagoi and Meteora" with its seat in the town of Kalabaka.

Province
The province of Kalabaka was one of the provinces of the Trikala Prefecture. It had the same territory as the present municipality of Meteora. It was abolished in 2006.

Transport
The city is served by Kalambaka station on the Palaiofarsalos-Kalambaka line.

Geography and demographics
The town is situated at the foot of the Meteora peaks. It is inhabited by an important native-indigenous community of Greek Vlachs.

Government

Kalampaka is a municipal unit of the municipality of Meteora. The municipal unit of Kalampaka has an area of 277.087 km2. The municipal unit (which corresponds with the municipality as it existed between 1997 and 2010) consists of the following communities (constituent settlements in brackets):
Avra (Avra, Nea Zoi)
Diava (Diava, Koromilia)
Kalabaka (Kalabaka, Agia Paraskevi, Vitoumas)
Kastraki
Krya Vrysi (Krya Vrysi, Trifyllia)
Megali Kerasea (Megali Kerasea, Mourgkani)
Orthovouni
Sarakina
Vlachava

Twin towns
Kalampaka has two twin towns:
Schwabach, Germany
Le Haillan, France

Recognition
Kalabaka was voted as one of the most beautiful places in Greece by the Skai TV show I LOVE GR.

Notable people

 Kostas Fortounis, professional footballer who was born in nearby Trikala but he and his family are from Kalabaka.
 Christos Albanis, professional footballer who was born in the town.
Demoulas family, Greek-American Supermarket-business family whose founders, Athanasios and Efrosine Demoulas were born in Kalabaka.

References

Sources

Richard Stillwell, William L. MacDonald, Marian Holland McAllister, Stillwell, Richard, MacDonald, William L., McAlister, Marian Holland, Aiginion, in The Princeton Encyclopedia of Classical Sites.
A. Avramea, I Vyzantini Thessalia mechri tou 1204 [Byzantine Thessaly up to 1204], doctoral dissertation, Athens 1974, EKPA-Vivliothiki Sofias N. Saripolou 27, Athens 1974, pp. 158–161. 
V. Spanos, Istoria-Prosopographia tis BD. Thessalias to B' miso tou ID' aiona. [History-Portrait of NW Thessaly the 2nd half of the 14th c.], Larisa 1995 
I. Vogiatzidis, To chronikon ton Meteoron [The Chronicle of Meteora], Yearbook of Society for Byzantine Studies 2 (1925), pp. 149–162. 
D. Sofianos, Acta Stagorum, Ta yper tis Thessalikis episkopis Stagon palaia vyzantina eggrafa (ton eton 1163, 1336 kai 1393) [Acta Stagorum: the Byzantine documents for the Thessalic diocese of Stagai [from the years 1163, 1336 and 1393)], Trikalina 13 (1993), pp. 7–67. 
St. Aristarchis, "Ekthesis epi ton diagonismaton Thessalias kai Epirou", [Report on the examinations in Epirus and Thessaly] O en Konstantinoupolei Ellinikos Filologikos Syllogos 13-15 (1867), pp. 31–39 
L. Heuzey – H.Daumet, Mission arhéologique de Macédoine, Paris 1876, pp. 452–454,
L.Heuzey, Odoiporiko stin Tourkokratoumeni Thessalia to 1858 [Excursion dans la Thessalie turque en 1858], transl. Ch. Dimitropoulos, publ. Afoi Kyriakidi, Thessaloniki 1991, pp. 152–157 
F. Dölger, Regesten der kaiserurkunden des oströmischen reiches von 565-1453,Verlag, München-Berlin 1960,pp. 159–160.
P.Sustal, Hellas und Thessalia, (TIB 1), ed Η. Hunger., Österreichischen Akademie der Wissenschaften, Bonn 1976, p. 262.
Ch. Astruc, Un document inédit de 1163 sur l' évêché thessalien, de Stagi, Paris.Suppl. Gr. 1371, BCH, vol. 83(1959),pp. 206–246

External links

 Natural History Museum of Meteora and Mushroom Museum | Kalambaka's Museum
 Holy Metropolis of Stagon and Meteoron
 Official site of the Metéora Monasteries
 News from Kalampaka and the surrounding area
 The Radio of Kalampaka

Provinces of Greece
Cities in ancient Greece
Aromanian settlements in Greece
Populated places in Trikala (regional unit)
Natura 2000 in Greece